Luis Hernan Castro Leiva (23 February 1943 – 8 April 1999) was a Venezuelan political philosopher, historian, writer and columnist. He is known for his televised speech on 23 January 1998 for the National Congress in which he warns against bolivarianism, cronyism and atavistic absolutism. He was one of the country's foremost advocates for democracy and an outspoken critic of Hugo Chávez, which he considered a populist. Castro is also credited with introducing rugby to Venezuela.

References

External links
 Luis Castro Leiva addresses the Republican Congres of Venezuela (1998) - YouTube
 Luis Castro Leiva online books (in Spanish) 
 Obituary in the University of Chicago Chronicle where Castro was Visiting Professor in Latin American History
 Death of a rugby player (in Spanish)

1943 births
1999 deaths
Venezuelan male writers
20th-century Venezuelan historians
Central University of Venezuela alumni
Academic staff of the Central University of Venezuela